The 1996 Temple Owls football team represented Temple University in the 1996 NCAA Division I-A football season as a member of the Big East Conference. They were led by fourth-year head coach Ron Dickerson. The Owls played their home games at Veterans Stadium in Philadelphia, Pennsylvania. They finished the season 1–10 overall and 0–7 in Big East play to place last.

Schedule

References

Temple
Temple Owls football seasons
Temple Owls football